Kokkinos Milos is a neighbourhood in the southern part of the city of Patras, Achaea, Greece.

Nearest places
 Ities, north
 Lefka, east
 Paralia, south

References
 Ν.Ι. Λυμπέρη, Οδηγός Πατρών, 4η έκδοση, Πάτρα 2005, p. 47 (in Greek)

Neighborhoods in Patras